Mashed carrot is a dish prepared by cooking and then mashing carrots. Milk, butter, salt and pepper are commonly mixed in after the carrots are mashed.  Carrots can also be roasted in the oven before mashing. Other mashed vegetables may be added to the mashed carrots. These include onions, parsnips, turnips, squash, and rutabaga. Mashed potatoes may be mashed along with mashed carrots.

Ingredients
The main ingredients are:

cooked carrots
butter
 salt
 pepper

Herbs, spices and other ingredients are often added:
chili powder
curry powder
onion powder
dried thyme
dried sage
chicken stock
lemon juice
parsley
cilantro
garlic
sugar
cream
lemon juice
honey
cinnamon
ginger
orange zest
orange liqueur
nutmeg

Preparation
To create mashed carrots, the carrots are prepared and cut into a uniform size and boiled, steamed or roasted. The cooked carrots then can be mashed in a food processor or by hand with a potato masher. In addition, canned carrots can be used to prepare mashed carrots. Mashed carrots are served hot.

Culinary uses
Mashed carrots may be served as a side dish. They are a major ingredient in carrot muffins, carrot cookies and carrot souffle. Mashed carrots are used in the home for baby food  and in commercially prepared 'baby' food.

See also

List of carrot dishes
Mashed potatoes 
Mashed pumpkin

References

Vegetable dishes
Carrot dishes